Bruno Vale (born 10 July 1911) was an Italian professional football player and coach.

Honours
 Coppa Italia winner: 1938/39.
 Greek league winning coach, 1958–59
 Greek Cup winning coach, 1959

External links

1911 births
Year of death missing
Italian footballers
Serie A players
U.S. Alessandria Calcio 1912 players
S.S. Arezzo players
Venezia F.C. players
Inter Milan players
Novara F.C. players
Brescia Calcio players
A.C. Reggiana 1919 players
Italian football managers
Olympiacos F.C. managers
Expatriate football managers in Greece

Association football midfielders
A.S. Pro Gorizia players